Maria Zdravkova Grozdeva-Grigorova (born on 23 June 1972) is a Bulgarian retired sport shooter, who competed in 25 metre pistol and 10 metre air pistol. She is the only woman to have successfully defended the 25 metre pistol title at the Olympic Games. She competed at the 2020 Summer Olympics, in Women's 25 metre pistol, and Women's 10 metre air pistol.

Apart from her five Olympic medals including two gold medals, Grozdeva also has been successful at CISM World Championships and ISSF World Cups. She is also the current holder of the final world record in 25 metre pistol.

Life 
Grozdeva was born on 23 June 1972 in Sofia. She began shooting at the age of 11, and graduated in sports shooting from the National Sports Academy. She is married to her coach Valeri Grigorov, with whom she has three children.

Grozdeva announced her decision to retire from professional sports after competing at the 2020 Summer Olympics. She was among the founders of the Bulgarian Shooting Union and served as its president between 2012 and 2022, being succeeded by Vesela Letcheva.

Other endeavors
In, 2009 Grozdeva competed as a house guest in the third season of the reality show VIP Brother. She made it into the final three and then placed runner up for the season.

Olympic results

Records

References

External links
 
 
 

1972 births
Living people
Sportspeople from Sofia
Bulgarian female sport shooters
ISSF pistol shooters
Olympic shooters of Bulgaria
World record holders in shooting
Shooters at the 1992 Summer Olympics
Shooters at the 1996 Summer Olympics
Shooters at the 2000 Summer Olympics
Shooters at the 2004 Summer Olympics
Shooters at the 2008 Summer Olympics
Shooters at the 2012 Summer Olympics
Olympic gold medalists for Bulgaria
Olympic bronze medalists for Bulgaria
Olympic medalists in shooting
Big Brother (Bulgarian TV series) contestants
Shooters at the 2015 European Games
European Games competitors for Bulgaria
Medalists at the 2004 Summer Olympics
Medalists at the 2000 Summer Olympics
Medalists at the 1996 Summer Olympics
Medalists at the 1992 Summer Olympics
Shooters at the 2019 European Games
Shooters at the 2020 Summer Olympics
20th-century Bulgarian women
21st-century Bulgarian women